Clifford Gray may refer to:

 Clifford Gray (politician) (born 1940), member of the Pennsylvania House of Representatives
 Clifford Gray (athlete) (1892–1969), American bobsledder, songwriter and actor

See also 
 Clifford Grey (1887–1941), English songwriter, librettist and actor